Nubsella is a genus from the family of Sphingobacteriaceae with one known species (Nubsella zeaxanthinifaciens).

References

Further reading 
 
 

Sphingobacteriia
Bacteria genera
Monotypic bacteria genera